Adibhatla is one of Indian surnames.

 Adibhatla Kailasam, an Indian communist leader
 Ajjada Adibhatla Narayana Dasu, poet, musician, dancer, linguist and philosopher